Njogu Demba-Nyrén (born 26 June 1979 in Bakau) is a Gambian footballer who has represented the Gambia at full international level and currently plays in Sweden for Dalhem IF.

Greece 
He had a successful career in Greece where he played for a lot of the Greek Superleague teams.

Notts County 
On 4 March 2011 Demba-Nyrén signed for Notts County on a contract until the end of the season. He scored his first and only goal of the 2010/11 season in a 3-1 defeat against Dagenham & Redbridge.  On 16 May 2011 the club announced Demba-Nyrén would not be having his contract renewed.

Honours

Greece 
Greek Premier League: 2003/04
Greek football Cup: 2003/04

References

External links

1979 births
Living people
Naturalized citizens of Sweden
Gambian footballers
BK Häcken players
PAS Giannina F.C. players
Aris Thessaloniki F.C. players
PFC Levski Sofia players
Panathinaikos F.C. players
A.O. Kerkyra players
Esbjerg fB players
SK Brann players
Odense Boldklub players
Notts County F.C. players
IK Brage players
Danish Superliga players
Super League Greece players
First Professional Football League (Bulgaria) players
Allsvenskan players
Eliteserien players
English Football League players
Gambian expatriate footballers
Expatriate footballers in Greece
Expatriate footballers in Bulgaria
Expatriate men's footballers in Denmark
Expatriate footballers in Norway
The Gambia international footballers
Gambian expatriate sportspeople in Bulgaria
Dalkurd FF players
People from Bakau
Association football forwards